The 1982 Humboldt State Lumberjacks football team represented Humboldt State University—now known as California State Polytechnic University, Humboldt—as a member of the Northern California Athletic Conference (NCAC) during the 1982 NCAA Division II football season. Led by 17th-year head coach Bud Van Deren, Humboldt State compiled an overall record of 3–7 with a mark of 1–4 in conference play, tying for fifth place in the NCAC. The team was outscored by its opponents 191 to 131 for the season. The Lumberjacks played home games at the Redwood Bowl in Arcata, California.

Schedule

References

Humboldt State
Humboldt State Lumberjacks football seasons
Humboldt State Lumberjacks football